Tomáš Myšička (born April 8, 1978) is a Czech former professional ice hockey left winger.

Myšička played one game for HC Sparta Praha during the 1998–99 Czech Extraliga season. The following year, he moved to France where he played the remainder of his career, beginning with Dauphins d'Épinal of the FFHG Division 1 where he spent four seasons. In 2003, Myšička moved to Ducs d'Angers of the Ligue Magnus. He had an enjoyable first season with 12 goals and 25 points from 23 games, but in his second season his production dropped to just five goals and ten points in 24 games.

In 2005, he returned to Division 1 with Corsaires de Dunkerque before moving to Bisons de Neuilly-sur-Marne a year later. He helped the team earn promotion to the Ligue Magnus in the 2007–08 season, which would be his last as a player.

Myšička played in the 1996 IIHF European U18 Championship for the Czech Republic where he scored two goals and registered two assists in five games.

References

External links

1978 births
Living people
Bisons de Neuilly-sur-Marne players
Corsaires de Dunkerque players
Czech ice hockey left wingers
Dauphins d'Épinal players
Ducs d'Angers players
HC Sparta Praha players
Ice hockey people from Prague
Czech expatriate sportspeople in France
Expatriate ice hockey players in France
Czech expatriate ice hockey people